Tongue River Reservoir State Park is a public recreation area located 6 miles north of Decker, Montana, on the western shore of the Tongue River Reservoir. The 12-mile-long reservoir is an impoundment of the Tongue River. The state park, occupying 642 acres at an elevation of 3468 feet, offers boating, fishing, camping, swimming, wildlife viewing, and a seasonal marina.

Fishing 
This state park offers a 3,600 acre reservoir that is regularly stocked for fishing. Management emphases is for crappie, smallmouth bass, northern pike, and walleye.

References

External links

Tongue River Reservoir State Park Montana Fish, Wildlife & Parks

State parks of Montana
Protected areas of Big Horn County, Montana
Protected areas established in 1983
1983 establishments in Montana